Tom Crane (21 December 1921 – 20 May 2010) was an Australian rules footballer who played with South Melbourne and North Melbourne in the Victorian Football League (VFL).

Crane, a defender, was never a regular fixture in the South Melbourne team, playing just seven games in four seasons at the club. He crossed to North Melbourne during the 1945 VFL season, where his brother Jack played. Another brother, Len, was a South Melbourne and Hawthorn footballer.

He joined Northcote in 1946.

References

1921 births
Australian rules footballers from Victoria (Australia)
Sydney Swans players
North Melbourne Football Club players
Northcote Football Club players
2010 deaths